Horlock is a surname. Notable people with the surname include:

Alfred Horlock (born 1822) British engineer
Brian Horlock (born 1931), British Anglican priest
Ernest George Horlock (1885–1917), British Army soldier and Victoria Cross recipient
John Horlock (born 1928), British engineer
Kevin Horlock (born 1972), English-born Northern Ireland footballer